The 1957 Idaho Vandals football team represented the University of Idaho in the 1957 NCAA University Division football season. The Vandals were led by fourth-year head coach Skip Stahley and were members of the Pacific Coast Conference. Home games were played on campus at Neale Stadium in Moscow, with one home game in Boise at old Bronco Stadium at Boise Junior College.

The Vandals suffered a third straight loss in the Battle of the Palouse with neighbor Washington State, falling  at Rogers Field in Pullman on November 16. The loss prevented the first winning season for Idaho football since 1938. In the rivalry game with Montana, the Vandals ran their winning streak over the Grizzlies to six and retained the Little Brown Stein.

Notable players
This Vandal team had several players who went on to extended careers in professional football.  of Sandpoint played eleven seasons at right guard with the Green Bay Packers and won five NFL titles (and the first two Super Bowls) under head coach Vince Lombardi. He was an All-Pro five times and was the lead blocker on the famous Packers sweep. Kramer made the NFL's all-decade team for the 1960s and was the last member of the NFL's 50th anniversary team to be inducted into Pro Football Hall of Fame, at age 82 in 2018.

Wayne Walker of Boise played fifteen seasons with the Detroit Lions as an outside linebacker and was named All-Pro three times. Both were selected in the fourth round of the 1958 NFL Draft; Kramer was 39th overall and Walker 45th, and both were periodic placekickers as pros. (As Vandals, Kramer was the kicker and Walker was the long snapper.)

Sophomore Jim Norton of Fullerton, California, was a safety and punter for nine seasons with the Houston Oilers; he was the all-time interceptions leader in the American Football League and his #43 was the first retired by the franchise.

Jim Prestel of Indianapolis was a defensive tackle for eight seasons in the NFL, primarily with the expansion Minnesota Vikings. A junior in 1957, he missed most of the season due to his mother's terminal illness. Selected in the sixth round of the 1959 NFL Draft, 70th overall, he was granted another year of eligibility and played for Idaho in 1959 and began his pro career with the Cleveland Browns in 1960. Prestel was also a standout player on the Vandal basketball team. He played in his final game at Idaho in the Battle of the Palouse in late October with a broken foot, then was sidelined and missed the basketball season.

Schedule

Roster

All-Coast

Because of their limited conference schedule, no Vandals were on the All-PCC first team (eleven spots), but two were selected for the second team; guard Jerry Kramer and center Wayne Walker. Honorable mention were quarterback Howard Willis, end Larry Aldrich, and fullback

NFL Draft
Five Vandals were selected in the 1958 NFL Draft:

^ Patterson and Johnson were granted another year of eligibility and played for Idaho in 1958.

One junior was selected in the 1959 NFL Draft:

^ Prestel was granted another year of eligibility and played for Idaho in 1959.

Two sophomores were selected in the 1960 NFL Draft:

List of Idaho Vandals in the NFL Draft

References

External links
Gem of the Mountains: 1958 University of Idaho yearbook – 1957 football season 
Go Mighty Vandals – 1957 football season
Official game program: Idaho at Washington State –  November 16, 1957
Idaho Argonaut – student newspaper – 1957 editions

Idaho
Idaho Vandals football seasons
Idaho Vandals football